Park Mountain is a  mountain summit located above the southwest shore of Lake McArthur in Yoho National Park, in the Bow Range of the Canadian Rockies of British Columbia, Canada. Its nearest higher peak is Mount Biddle,  to the east.

History

The mountain was named in 1915 because of the "park-like" setting of the area. The Lake O'Hara area that the mountain is located in is a gem within a park, the best that the Canadian Rockies has to offer.

The first ascent of the mountain was made in 1904 by a survey party.

The mountain's toponym was officially adopted in 1952 when approved by the Geographical Names Board of Canada.

Geology
Park Mountain is composed of sedimentary rock laid down during the Precambrian to Jurassic periods. Formed in shallow seas, this sedimentary rock was pushed east and over the top of younger rock during the Laramide orogeny.

Climate
Based on the Köppen climate classification, Park Mountain is located in a subarctic climate zone with cold, snowy winters, and mild summers. Winter temperatures can drop below −20 °C with wind chill factors below −30 °C. Precipitation runoff from Park Mountain drains into tributaries of the Kicking Horse River which is a tributary of the Columbia River.

References

See also

Geography of British Columbia

External links
 Parks Canada web site: Yoho National Park
 Park Mountain and Odaray Mountain panoramic photo: Flickr

Two-thousanders of British Columbia
Canadian Rockies
Mountains of Yoho National Park
Kootenay Land District